Harrison County State Forest may refer to:
Harrison–Crawford State Forest in Indiana
Harrison State Forest in Ohio